Sony India Pvt. Ltd., based in New Delhi,  is the Indian subsidiary of Japan's Sony corporation, headquartered in Tokyo. 

Sony's principal Indian businesses include Marketing, Sales and After-Sales Service of electronic products & software exports Products: LCD Televisions, Video and Digital Still Cameras, Notebooks and Business Projectors, Personal Audio, Audio Video Accessories, Hi-fi Audios and Home Theater systems, Car Audio and Visual Systems, Game Consoles, Mobile Phones, Recording Media and Energy Devices, Broadcast and Professional products. 

In India, Sony has its footprint across all major towns and cities in the country through a distribution network of over 20,000 dealers and distributors, 300 exclusive Sony outlets and 25 direct branch locations. Moreover, Sony's 19 sales branches cover a total of 450 cities. It has also developed a network of 270 Sony Center and established 30 warehouses across the country to manage its supply chain effectively.

Sony India Software Centre Pvt. Ltd.

Sony currently has global software development facilities in the United States, Europe, Japan, China and India. Among these, Sony India Software Centre (SISC), located in Bengaluru—India’s Silicon Valley—has expanded notably in recent years. Established in 1997, SISC serves as a development base for software used in a wide range of products manufactured by Sony Group companies around the world and as the Group’s global offshore IT centre. With the role of software taking on ever-greater importance in this digitized age, SISC is rapidly augmenting its team of engineers. In fiscal year 2010, ended 31 March 2011, SISC had approximately 1,000 engineers on staff.  Their work contributed to efforts of the entire Sony Group to advance state-of-the-art 3D technologies, as well as to the development of new products, including Sony Internet TV, Sony Tablet and Android based mobile phones and other devices. As the Group’s strategic offshore IT centre, they worked together with Sony Group companies with the aim of reinforcing the Group’s operating foundation.

In early 2012, Sony Corp restructured its India business by creating two separate units, one for undertaking sales and marketing operations, headquartered at New Delhi and the other for focusing on software and product development based in Bengaluru. As a result, Sony India Software Centre Pvt. Ltd. was de-merged from Sony India Pvt. Ltd. as a separate entity aiming at more effective operations.

Notes and references

External links
 Sony India website
 Sony Corporation website

Entertainment companies of India
Sony subsidiaries
Indian subsidiaries of foreign companies
Mass media companies of India
Mass media companies based in Delhi
Indian companies established in 1994
Entertainment companies established in 1994
Mass media companies established in 1994